is a Japanese swimmer. At the 2012 Summer Olympics, she competed for the national team in the Women's 4 × 100 metre freestyle relay, finishing in 7th place in the final.

At the 2016 Japanese Championships and Olympic trials in April, she broke the national record in the 100-meter freestyle with a time of 53.88.

References

Japanese female freestyle swimmers
1995 births
Living people
Olympic swimmers of Japan
Swimmers at the 2012 Summer Olympics
Swimmers at the 2016 Summer Olympics
Asian Games medalists in swimming
Swimmers at the 2014 Asian Games
Asian Games gold medalists for Japan
Asian Games silver medalists for Japan
Asian Games bronze medalists for Japan
Medalists at the 2014 Asian Games
21st-century Japanese women